San Lorenzo Airport ,  is an airport  east of Quilleco, a small town in the Bío Bío Region of Chile. The airport is in the valley of the Duqueco River, near the hamlet of Duqueco.

The runway has an additional  of unpaved overrun on the northwest end. There is rising terrain in all quadrants.

See also

Transport in Chile
List of airports in Chile

References

External links
OpenStreetMap - San Lorenzo
OurAirports - San Lorenzo
FallingRain - San Lorenzo Airport

Airports in Chile
Airports in Biobío Region